Zlatko Dalić (born 26 October 1966) is a Croatian professional football manager and former player. He has been manager of the Croatia national team since 2017 and led them to a runners-up finish at the 2018 FIFA World Cup and third place at the 2022 FIFA World Cup.

Playing career

During his time as a player, Dalić played for a number of clubs. 

He started off his youth career at Troglav 1918 Livno, before joining Hajduk Split in 1983 and thus starting his senior career. He stayed at Hajduk Split until 1986, after joining Cibalia, which was at that time known as Dinamo Vinkovci. Apart from Hajduk Split and Cibalia, Dalić also played for Budućnost Titograd, Velež Mostar and Varteks. He finished his career in 2000 at Varteks.

Coaching career

Varteks
After ending his playing career in 2000, he became assistant coach at Varteks. From May 2002 to May 2005, Dalić worked as the club's sports director, and during the 2003–04 and 2004–05 seasons he simultaneously acted as assistant coach for Miroslav Blažević.

In May 2005, he was appointed manager of Varteks and in his first season at the helm he won third place in the Croatian First League and reached the final of the Croatian Cup. In the first leg of the final, which was played in Rijeka, Varteks lost 0–4 to HNK Rijeka. In the second leg in Varaždin, Dalić nearly created a sensation leading the team to a 5–1 win, but they were one goal short from lifting the silverware.

Rijeka
In the summer of 2007, after his contract with Varteks ended, he became manager of Rijeka, and finished fourth at the end of the 2007–08 season. After being knocked out of the 2008 UEFA Intertoto Cup by FK Renova, Dalić was sacked on 1 July 2008 just before the start of the season.

Dinamo Tirana
In the 2008–09 season, Dalić managed Albanian champions Dinamo Tirana, with whom he won the Albanian Supercup. He resigned in February 2009 after losing two derbies in a row versus fellow capital teams Tirana and Partizani.

Slaven Belupo
After a short stint in Albania, he returned to Croatia in 2009 and took over his third Croatian football club, Slaven Belupo.

Al-Faisaly
In the 2010–11 season, he became head coach of Al-Faisaly. At the end of the 2010–11 season under Dalić the club enjoyed the greatest success in its history, qualifying for the King's Cup in the Saudi Professional League. Dalić was named Coach of the Year in the Saudi Professional League for the 2010–11 season by Al Riyadh newspapers. In the selection, he beat other more famous coaches working in Saudi Arabia at the time, such as Gabriel Calderón, Walter Zenga and Eric Gerets.

Al-Hilal
On 3 May 2012, Dalić signed a contract with Saudi Arabian club Al-Hilal to manage their B team. On 30 January, Al-Hilal agreed with Dalić to coach the first team following the sacking of Antoine Kombouaré. On 9 February 2013, he made his managerial debut with Al-Hilal against his old club Al-Faisaly in the semi-final of the 2012–13 Saudi Crown Prince Cup. Dalić eventually led Al-Hilal to the cup title–the team's sixth consecutive win–which was also Dalić's second major title in his coaching career. During the 2013–14 season, he was the main candidate for the position of sports director at Croatian powerhouse Hajduk Split, but turned down the offer from one of the biggest clubs in Croatian football.

Al-Ain

On 8 March 2014, Dalić was appointed manager of Al-Ain in the United Arab Emirates after the team had sacked Quique Sánchez Flores. In his first season, he led the team to finish top of their group in the 2014 AFC Champions League, which was the first time since 2006 that the club progressed through the group stage. On 30 April 2014, Al-Ain announced that Dalić would remain head coach for the next two seasons. In the round of sixteen of the 2014 AFC Champions League, Al-Ain beat Al-Jazira by 4–2 to advance to the quarter-finals; in the quarter-finals, the team beat Al-Ittihad 5–1 to advance to the semi-finals, ultimately losing 4–2 to Al-Hilal, which was Dalić's former team.

On 18 May 2014, Al-Ain won the final game of UAE President's Cup against league champions Al-Ahli 1–0, which secured Dalić's first trophy as manager of Al-Ain.

Dalić won the title of Best Coach of 2014 for his performances; at the end of the first round of the UAE Pro-League, Al–Ain took the first position with one game in hand. Eventually, Al-Ain won their 12th UAE Pro-League title in the 2014–15 season. The club finished the season 11 points above runners-up Al Jazira and Al Shabab Dubai, only losing two games throughout the season; in this season, they also achieved several records, namely conceding the fewest goals (19), the longest unbeaten run (15 matches), the longest winning run (8 matches), and the biggest home win against Ajman (7–1).

On 12 July 2015, Dalić received the Coach of the Year accolade during the UAE Pro-League award ceremony for the 2014–15 UAE Pro-League season for guiding his side to winning the league title.

Dalić's first match of the 2015–16 season was a UAE Super Cup match between Al-Ain and Al-Nasr Dubai, played on 15 August and resulted in victory for Al-Ain, which won 4–2. Following a 3–0 win against Al-Ahli Dubai in the 10th round of the UAE Pro-League on 5 December, Dalić became the best coach in the league's history since it turned professional, though Al-Ain ultimately finished second in the league in 2016. The club also reached the 2016 AFC Champions League final, ultimately losing 2–3 to Jeonbuk Motors.

Dalić's tenure as manager of Al-Ain saw the club rise rapidly in the Football Database Ranking; initially, the club was ranked 335th in March 2014, when Dalić arrived, and by the time of his departure, the club was ranked 122nd in the world, also reaching 5th position in Asia, according to the ranking.

Dalić formally departed Al-Ain in January 2017, citing a "need for rest" as his reason for departing.

Croatia

On 7 October 2017, following the sacking of Ante Čačić due to a series of poor results, the Croatian Football Federation named Dalić as the head coach of the Croatia national football team. Upon arriving, Dalić announced that he would only remain head coach if Croatia qualifies for the 2018 FIFA World Cup and that the HNS would decide his future if Croatia miss out on qualifying for the finals.

On 9 October, Dalić led Croatia to a 2–0 win over Ukraine in 2018 World Cup qualifying, which also secured second place in their group, and a place in the play-off round. On 19 October, Dalić named Ivica Olić, former Croatia international player, as his assistant manager. Croatia drew Greece in the play-off round, and on 9 November, Dalić led the team to a 4–1 first-leg triumph over Greece, all but securing a place in the 2018 World Cup. In the return leg, on 12 November, Croatia drew with Greece 0–0, but won 4–1 on aggregate, thus securing a place in the World Cup finals. Following this, Dalić officially signed a contract with the Croatian Football Federation, running until 30 July 2020, and would reportedly earn around €500,000 per year.

Croatia drew a challenging group, with the likes of Nigeria, Argentina and Iceland. On 16 June, Croatia won their opening match of the 2018 World Cup, beating Nigeria by a scoreline of 2–0. However, during the game, forward Nikola Kalinić had refused to come on as a late substitute, citing a back injury as his excuse, although he had used this excuse earlier during a friendly match against Brazil, as well as the previous training session. This prompted Dalić to send him home on just the fifth day of the tournament. Dalić stated that he needed "prepared players, while Kalinić did not show up at three occasions". Dalić received praise for his treatment of Kalinić, with some stating that he had cemented his position as a head coach with the decision. On 21 June, Croatia overwhelmed football heavyweights Argentina, winning by a scoreline of 3–0, with Ante Rebić, Luka Modrić and Ivan Rakitić scoring the goals. The victory led Croatia to a spot in the knockout stage for the first time since the 1998 FIFA World Cup, in which they finished third place. On 26 June, Croatia topped their group with maximum points following a 2–1 win over Iceland, and drew Denmark in the round of sixteen, advancing after a penalty shootout. Croatia again won through a penalty shootout against hosts Russia in the quarter-finals, setting up a semi-final tie against England. On 11 July, Croatia beat England 2–1, advancing to the final, where they lost 4–2 to France on 15 July. For the achievement, he received the Franjo Bučar State Award for Sport Yearly Award.

In the inaugural edition of UEFA Nations League, Croatia was drawn in the same group as Spain and England. Croatia opened their Nations League campaign on 11 September with a disastrous 6–0 defeat to Spain in Elche.  However, on 15 November, Croatia managed to get revenge with a 3–2 victory in Zagreb. Nevertheless, due to a goalless draw with England in Rijeka on 12 October and a 2–1 defeat in London on 18 November, Croatia were relegated to League B. However, due to a format change, Croatia avoided relegation and remained in League A.

Croatia entered their UEFA Euro 2020 qualifying campaign poorly with narrow 2–1 home victories over Azerbaijan and Wales, and an upset 2–1 away defeat to Hungary. However, Croatia returned to form beating Slovakia 4–0 away in Trnava. On 16 November 2019, in their last qualifying match, Croatia beat Slovakia 3–1 in Rijeka, topping the group and securing their place at the finals. Applauded for his successful handling of the national team after the retirement of some prominent internationals such as Mario Mandžukić and Danijel Subašić, successful integration of new names such as Bruno Petković, Josip Brekalo and Nikola Vlašić into the team and successful qualifying campaign, Dalić signed a new contract on 23 July 2020 with the Croatian Football Federation that kept him at the position of Croatia manager until the end of 2022, earning an annual salary of €1.6 million.

Croatia entered their 2020–21 UEFA Nations League campaign poorly, losing heavily to Portugal and France away, 4–1 and 4–2 respectively. After beating Sweden 2–1 at home, Croatia failed to win any of the rest of the matches. They finished third in their group and avoided relegation to League B solely due to having better goal difference than last-placed Sweden. Croatia also notably conceded more goals than any other team in the Nations League. Despite calls from the general public for Dalić to resign, he retained his job.

Croatia began their qualification for the 2022 FIFA World Cup with a loss away to Slovenia, drawing further criticism. However, after the first game, Croatia finished the campaign unbeaten, drawing only away to Russia and at home to Slovakia. A first place finish made Dalić the first coach in the history of the team to qualify them for three major tournaments. In the 2022 World Cup, Dalić led Croatia to their second consecutive semi-final and third in total, after beating Brazil on penalties in the quarter-finals. However, Dalic's side would be eliminated 3-0 in the semifinals by Argentina. He would go on to beat Morocco 2-1 in the third place play-off, Croatia’s second-joint best finish in a World Cup.

Personal life
Born on 26 October 1966, in Livno, then a part of SR Bosnia and Herzegovina, within SFR Yugoslavia, today’s Bosnia and Herzegovina, Dalić comes from a Bosnian Croat family of mother Kata and father Ivan Dalić. He holds Croatian citizenship. 

In 1992, Dalić married his wife Davorka Propadalo, whom he met at a high school in Livno. They have together two sons, Toni and Bruno. Dalić is a practicing Roman Catholic, and prays the Rosary during every match.

Playing statistics

Source:

Managerial statistics

Source:

Honours

Player
Hajduk Split 
Yugoslav Cup: 1983–84

Manager
Varteks
Croatian Cup runner-up: 2005–06

Dinamo Tirana
Albanian Supercup: 2008

Al-Hilal
Saudi Crown Prince Cup: 2012–13
Saudi Professional League runner-up: 2012–13

Al-Ain
UAE President's Cup: 2013–14
UAE Pro-League: 2014–15
UAE Super Cup: 2015
AFC Champions League runner-up: 2016

Croatia
FIFA World Cup runner-up: 2018; third place: 2022

Bibliography

Rusija naših snova (Russia of Our Dreams) (2018)

Orders
  Order of Duke Trpimir with Ribbon and Star

References

External links
 

Hajduk Split profile

1966 births
Living people
Sportspeople from Livno
Croats of Bosnia and Herzegovina
Association football midfielders
Yugoslav footballers
Croatian footballers
HNK Hajduk Split players
HNK Cibalia players
FK Budućnost Podgorica players
FK Velež Mostar players
NK Varaždin players
Yugoslav First League players
Croatian Football League players
Croatian football managers
NK Varaždin managers
HNK Rijeka managers
FK Dinamo Tirana managers
NK Slaven Belupo managers
Al-Faisaly FC managers
Al Hilal SFC managers
Al Ain FC managers
Croatia national football team managers
2018 FIFA World Cup managers
UEFA Euro 2020 managers
Croatian Football League managers
Kategoria Superiore managers
Saudi Professional League managers
UAE Pro League managers
Croatian expatriate football managers
Expatriate football managers in Albania
Croatian expatriate sportspeople in Albania
Expatriate football managers in Saudi Arabia
Croatian expatriate sportspeople in Saudi Arabia
Expatriate football managers in the United Arab Emirates
Croatian expatriate sportspeople in the United Arab Emirates
2022 FIFA World Cup managers